Ronald Charles Page (31 March 1951 – 24 December 2021) was an Australian rules footballer who played with South Melbourne in the Victorian Football League (VFL).

Notes

External links 

Tribute from Williamstown FC

1951 births
2021 deaths
Australian rules footballers from Victoria (Australia)
Sydney Swans players